The Feminist on Cellblock Y is an American documentary directed by Contessa Gayles and co-produced with Emma Lacey-Bordeaux for CNN. The titular subject is Richie Reseda, an inmate at a prison in California who studies and organizes around feminism and toxic masculinity with his fellow inmates. The documentary premiered on CNNgo on April 18, 2018.

Synopsis 
The film follows "a classroom of male prisoners as they wrestle with vulnerability and the confines of masculine norms through the lens of theorists such as bell hooks." Called Success Stories, the class is led by a 22 year-old inmate then known as Richard "Richie" Edmond Vargas. He teaches his fellow inmates about feminism and toxic masculinity at the Correctional Training Facility in Soledad, California. Richie's wife, Taina Vargas-Edmond also appears in the film.

Production

Background 
CNN producer Emma Lacey-Bordeaux met Richard "Richie" Reseda (then known by the name Richard Edmond Vargas) in 2008 when he was a high school student who was suspended for printing an image of the female anatomy on the cover of the school's student newspaper. Lacey-Bordeaux read about the story in the Los Angeles Times and interviewed Reseda about the incident in her role as director of the radio station at Georgia State University. She reached out again in 2016 when seeking sources for a CNN story about criminal justice, and Reseda's wife notified her that he was incarcerated for two armed robberies on local Rite Aid pharmacies.

Reseda and Lacey-Bordeaux began to converse by phone. She and fellow CNN producer Contessa Gayles developed the idea for the documentary after sitting in on Edmond's weekly feminist education group, Success Stories.

Filming 
The film was shot over several months and production worked around the correctional facility's regulations. It was directed and co-produced with Gayles, who also served as the cinematographer. The crew was small and consisted of Gayles, Lacey-Bordeaux, and sound mixer Eric Day.

Release 
The Feminist on Cellblock Y was released on CNNgo on April 18, 2018.

Awards 
 Vera Institute of Justice, Best of Justice Reform Award, 2018

References

External links 
 The Feminist on Cellblock Y on CNN
 
 The Feminist on Cellblock Y - Full movie on YouTube
 Success Stories Program - The feminist workshops featured in the film

2018 documentary films
American documentary films
Documentary films about crime in the United States
Films set in California
Works about feminism
Works about American prisons
2018 films
2010s English-language films
2010s American films